Michael "Mike" Bernardo is a Canadian actor, athlete, and coach, as well as a former champion martial artist and stuntman.

Although he found some fame through his roles in Shootfighter and its sequel, and as Turbo on WMAC Masters, he retired from acting to focus more on his chain of martial arts schools known as Bernardo Karate in London, Ontario, Canada.

Filmography

Film

Television

External links

Living people
Canadian stunt performers
Canadian male karateka
Canadian male television actors
Year of birth missing (living people)